Herring Shangpliang  is a former Indian football player and is the current head coach of I-League side Rangdajied United.

Coaching career

Shillong Lajong
Born in Meghalaya, Shangpliang started his coaching career at Shillong Lajong. In 2006, Shangpliang almost managed to coach Lajong to the National Football League but lost to Salgaocar. Then, in 2009, it was announced that Shangpliang would be made technical director of the club.

Rangdajied United
After the sacking of coach Santosh Kashyap, Shangpliang was signed to take over as head coach of Rangdajied United in the I-League. He coached the club for the first time on 1 March 2014, a 3–2 victory over league-leaders Bengaluru FC.

Statistics

Managerial statistics
.

References

Living people
Footballers from Meghalaya
Indian footballers
Indian football managers
I-League managers
Shillong Lajong FC managers
Year of birth missing (living people)
Association footballers not categorized by position